Danuta Jędrejek (born 17 January 1947) is a Polish sprinter. She competed in the women's 4 × 100 metres relay at the 1972 Summer Olympics.

References

1947 births
Living people
Athletes (track and field) at the 1972 Summer Olympics
Polish female sprinters
Olympic athletes of Poland
Place of birth missing (living people)
Olympic female sprinters